Half Mound is an unincorporated community in Jefferson County, Kansas, United States.

History
A post office was opened in Half Mound (spelled historically Halfmound) in 1898, and remained in operation until it was discontinued in 1914.

References

Further reading

External links
 Jefferson County maps: Current, Historic, KDOT

Unincorporated communities in Jefferson County, Kansas
Unincorporated communities in Kansas